In computer science, Orfeo Toolbox (OTB) is a software library for processing images from Earth observation satellites.

OTB was initiated by the French space agency (CNES) in 2006. The software is released under a free licence; a number of contributors outside CNES are taking part in development and integrating into other projects.

The library was originally targeted at high resolution images acquired by the Orfeo constellation: Pléiades and Cosmo-Skymed, but it also handles other sensors.

Purpose 
OTB provides:

 Image access: read/write access for most remote sensing image formats (using GDAL), meta-data access, visualization
 Data access: vector data access (shapefile, kml), DEM model, lidar data 
 Filtering: blurring, denoising, enhancement for optical or radar data 
 Feature extraction: texture computations including Haralick, SFS, Pantex, Edge density, points of interest, alignments, lines, SIFT, SURF
 Image segmentation: region growing, watershed, level sets 
 Classification: K-means, SVM, Markov random fields and access to all OpenCV machine learning algorithms
 Change detection
 Stereo reconstruction from images
 Orthorectification and map projections (using ossim) 
 Radiometric indices (vegetation, water, soil) 
 Object-based segmentation and filtering
 PCA computation
 Visualization: a flexible visualization system, customizable via plugins;

Languages and interaction with other software
OTB is a C++ library, based on Insight toolkit (ITK). Bindings are developed for Python. A method to use OTB components within IDL/ENVI has been published. One of the OTB user defined a procedure to use the library capabilities from MATLAB.

Since late 2009, some modules are developed as processing plugins for QGIS. Modules for classification, segmentation, hill shading have provided. This effort relies only on volunteers.

OTB algorithms are now available in QGIS through the processing framework Sextante.

Applications

Additionally to the library, several applications with GUI are distributed. These application enable interactive segmentation, orthorectification, classification, image registration, etc...

Monteverdi (version 1 and 2)

The OTB-Applications package makes available a set of simple software tools . It supports raster and vector data and integrates most of the already existing OTB applications. The architecture takes advantage of the streaming and multi-threading capabilities of the OTB pipeline. It also uses features such as processing on demand and automagic file format I/O. The application is called Monteverdi,

In 2013, Monteverdi software was revamped into a new software called Monteverdi2.

License

OTB was initially distributed under the French Open Source license CeCILL (similar and compatible with the GNU GPL) and is now available under the Apache 2.0 license.

History
The development started in January 2006  with the first release in July 2006. The development version is publicly accessible.

Release history

Presentations
OTB has been presented in major conferences across the five continents 
 IGARSS 2008 in Boston
 ISPRS 2008 in Beijing
 International Summer School on VHR Remote Sensing 2008 in Grenoble
 ESA-EUSC 2008 in Frascati
 EUSC Software days 2009 in Madrid
 AUF 2009 in Alger
 IGARSS 2009 in Cape Town for the invited session Open Source Initiatives for Remote Sensing - Orfeo Toolbox 
 FOSS4G 2009 in Sydney 
 Capacity building 2009 in Antananarivo
 Insight Toolkit 2010 Workshop in Washington as a keynote session 
 IGARSS 2010 in Honolulu for a tutorial 
 FOSS4G 2010 in Barcelona 
 OGRS 2012 in Yverdon Les Bains

According to statistics on Open Hub, there is a total of 83 contributors and almost 925,000 lines of code (this include many libraries upon which OTB is built).

OTB in also use for the development of the operational ground segment for the Venus (Vegetation & Environment new micro satellite) and the ESA Sentinel-2 missions.

References

External links

C++ libraries
Cross-platform software
Free computer libraries
Remote sensing software